Vadala Road (formerly Vuddalah  Road, station code: VDLR/VD), is a railway station on the Harbour Line of the Mumbai Suburban Railway. It was earlier called Gowari station.

This station is infamous for deaths of people who are crossing the tracks. Previously, forty people were killed on the tracks here every year. After behavioral "nudges" were implemented, such as painting ties to help people judge the speed of oncoming trains, and adding pictures of men being run over, the number of deaths reduced to 10 each year.

References

Mumbai Suburban Railway stations
Railway stations in Mumbai City district
Mumbai CR railway division